Musingo is a settlement in the Northern Region of Uganda at the international border with South Sudan.

Location
The coordinates of Musingo are 3°46'17.0"N, 33°11'59.0"E (Latitude:3.771389; Longitude:33.199722).

Points of interest
The following points of interest lie within the settlement or near its edges:

 offices of Musingo Town Council
 Musingo central market
 northern terminus of the  Rwekunye–Apac–Aduku–Lira–Kitgum–Musingo Road

See also

 Lamwo District
 Acholi sub-region
 List of cities and towns in Uganda
 List of roads in Uganda

References

Lamwo District
Populated places in Northern Region, Uganda
Cities in the Great Rift Valley
South Sudan–Uganda border crossings